The 1995–96 St. Louis Blues season was the 29th in franchise history. The Blues hired head coach Mike Keenan as general manager. One of Keenan's first moves was trading Brendan Shanahan to the Hartford Whalers for Chris Pronger. Late in the season, Keenan acquired Wayne Gretzky from the Los Angeles Kings, reuniting him with former Oilers such as Glenn Anderson, Charlie Huddy, Craig MacTavish, and Grant Fuhr. Fuhr was hurt in the final game of the regular season and only played 2 games in the playoffs.

The Blues defeated the Toronto Maple Leafs in the Western Conference Quarter-finals in the last playoff series ever played at Maple Leaf Gardens. In the Western Conference Semifinals, the Blues lost to the President's Trophy winners, the Detroit Red Wings, in seven games. The Blues had seven eventual Hockey Hall of Fame members during the season (Gretzky, Hull, MacInnis, Anderson, Fuhr, Hawerchuk and Pronger).

Regular season

Wayne Gretzky trade
On February 27, the St. Louis Blues acquired Wayne Gretzky from the Los Angeles Kings for Craig Johnson, Patrice Tardif, Roman Vopat and draft picks. In 18 regular season games with the Blues, Gretzky recorded 21 points as the Blues qualified for the playoffs for the 17th straight season with a record of 32–34–16. He scored 14 points in 13 playoff games for the team, and the Blues lost Game 7 of the conference semifinals in overtime. He also served as the team's captain (replacing Corson) during his short tenure with the Blues.

On July 12, he signed with the New York Rangers as a free agent, rejoining longtime Oilers teammate Mark Messier.

Final standings

Schedule and results

Playoffs
In the playoffs, Gretzky would provide a spark as the Blues overcame an injury to goalie Grant Fuhr in Game 1 to beat the Toronto Maple Leafs in 6 games. Backup goalie Jon Casey continued to keep the Blues hopes alive as they jumped out to a 3–2 series lead against the Detroit Red Wings. However, the Wings would rally and win the series in double overtime in Game 7 on Steve Yzerman's goal.

Player statistics

Regular season
Scoring

Goaltending

Playoffs
Scoring

Goaltending

Transactions
July 28, 1995 – Doug Lidster was traded by the St. Louis Blues to the New York Rangers in exchange for Jay Wells.

Draft picks
The 1995 NHL Entry Draft was held at Edmonton Coliseum in Edmonton, Canada. The drafting order was now set partially by a lottery system whereby teams would not be guaranteed first pick if they finished last.

See also
 1995–96 NHL season

References
 Blues on Hockey Database

S
S
St. Louis Blues seasons
St. Louis Blues
St. Louis Blues